Félix Erauzquin (20 November 1907 – 7 May 1987) was a Spanish athlete. He competed in the men's discus throw at the 1948 Summer Olympics.

References

1907 births
1987 deaths
Athletes (track and field) at the 1948 Summer Olympics
Spanish male discus throwers
Olympic athletes of Spain
Place of birth missing
Sportspeople from Biscay
People from Arratia-Nerbioi
Athletes from the Basque Country (autonomous community)